The Women's 4 × 200 metre freestyle relay competition at the 2022 World Aquatics Championships was held on 22 June 2022.

Records
Prior to the competition, the existing world and championship records were as follows.

The following new records were set during this competition.

Results

Heats
The heats were started at 10:11.

Final
The final was held at 19:50.

References

Women's 4 x 200 metre freestyle relay